Nullawil is a locality in Victoria, Australia, located approximately  from the state capital, Melbourne. At the 2021 census, Nullawil had a population of 92.

Nullawil Post Office opened on 26 April 1897. 

Nullawil Football Club played in the Golden Rivers Football League from 1908-2022. They won the premiership in 2022, before officially folding following the match, thus finishing in the rare situation of folding as premiers.

Gallery

References

Towns in Victoria (Australia)